Paróquia Santa Rita de Cássia is a church located in São Paulo, Brazil. It was established on 25 May 1937.

References

Churches in São Paulo